Jiang Hong (born June 19, 1967) is a former Chinese footballer who played as a goalkeeper. 

Starting his playing career Bayi Football Team it was his move to Shenzhen Feiyada, where he distinguished himself helping the club to earn successive league titles and promotions. He was eventually called up to the Chinese national side, where for a short period he competed with his brother Jiang Jin for the goalkeeping position. He also played for Qingdao Yizhong Hainiu and Shaanxi Guoli before he retired

Honours
 	
Shenzhen Feiyada

 Chinese Jia B League: 1995

Shaanxi Guoli
 	
 Chinese Jia B League: 2000

References

External links
Player profile at sodasoccer.com

1967 births
Living people
Association football goalkeepers
Chinese footballers
Footballers from Shanghai
China international footballers
1996 AFC Asian Cup players
Bayi Football Team players
Shenzhen F.C. players
Qingdao Hainiu F.C. (1990) players